The Palomino Club is a landmark North Las Vegas strip club. Since 2006 the club has been owned by Adam Gentile.

History
It was founded in 1969 but the building was built a couple decades prior. One of the notable differences between the Palomino and other Las Vegas strip clubs, is that it is allowed to have both a liquor license, and totally nude dancers.  Other clubs with liquor licenses are restricted to topless dancers.  This difference, according to 2003-2006 owner Luis Hidalgo Jr., is because the club was grandfathered until approximately 2025 with the different rules.

In 2000, a high-profile murder trial involved the Palomino Club owner's son, Jack Perry, who had shot and killed one of the employees he thought was trying to buy the club.  He pleaded guilty and was sentenced to 14 years to life in prison.

In 2002, the owner of the "Olympic Garden" club sued the owners of the Palomino, claiming they conspired with cabdrivers to divert customers.  It was evidently a common practice for some clubs, such as Palomino and Cheetah's, to offer $5–$25 per customer to cab drivers, to encourage the drivers to bring customers to their club instead of someone else's.  This put "non-kickback" clubs such as the Olympic Garden at a disadvantage. The case was eventually dropped. (Jordan, 2004)

Luis Hidalgo, Jr., took over the club in 2003.  One of the changes that he instituted was to start an all-male nude act, known as the "Palomino Stallions", to try to attract female customers.

In 2005, Luis Hidalgo Jr., his son, Luis Hidalgo III. and Hidalgo, Jr.'s longtime girlfriend, Anabel Espindola, were charged - and eventually found guilty - as co-conspirators in the contract murder of a former employee who had been telling competitors that Hidalgo Jr. was still paying cabdrivers to divert customers to the Palomino Club. Their former doorman, Timothy TJ Hadland, had been found shot dead on a road near Lake Mead on May 19, 2005, just two weeks after quitting the club.  Three other Palomino employees, and the actual killer, were also found guilty on charges related to Hadland's killing.  Their case was later shown on the TV show The First 48 on March 31, 2011 as a "Lost Episode".

In 2007, Hidalgo sold the club to his lawyer, Dominic Gentile, in order to cover legal fees.  Gentile is one of the city's more prominent defense attorneys, and received the land as payment from former Palomino owner Luis Hidalgo Jr. in exchange for Gentile's representation of Hidalgo in the investigation of the May 19, 2005, shooting death of Timothy Hadland. Dominic in turn turned the operation of the club over to his son, Adam Gentile, who had previously been the General Manager of Club Paradise.

In 2009 Gentile let cameras into the club to film King Of Clubs, a new reality series slated to premiere in Fall 2009 on Playboy TV.
 
That same year (2009), Hidalgo, Jr. and his son were sentenced to life in prison. The son's girlfriend took a plea deal for voluntary manslaughter in exchange for her testimony.

See also
 List of strip clubs
 Operation G-Sting

Notes

References
 "Lake Mead Shooting: Four charged with slaying", May 26, 2005, Las Vegas Review-Journal
 "Palomino strip club sold to pay off legal fees", March 15, 2006
 Brent Jordan, Stripped: Twenty Years of Secrets from Inside the Strip Club, 2004
 [w.kvbc.com/Global/story.asp?S=3393640 "Local Strip Club at the Center of Alleged Murder for Hire"], May 26, 2005, KVBC

External links
Official Palomino Club website

Nightclubs in the Las Vegas Valley
Buildings and structures in North Las Vegas, Nevada
Drinking establishments in Nevada
Strip clubs in the United States
Entertainment companies established in 1969
1969 establishments in Nevada
Sex industry in Nevada